Desire (Swedish: Begär) is a 1946 Swedish drama film directed by and starring Edvin Adolphson and also featuring Gunn Wållgren, Carl Deurell and Sven Magnusson. It was shot at the Centrumateljéerna Studios in Stockholm. The film's sets were designed by the art director Arthur Spjuth.

Cast
 Edvin Adolphson as 	Carsten Berg
 Carl Deurell as Johannes Berg
 Gunn Wållgren as 	Ingrid
 Sven Magnusson as 	Tore Wiborg
 Olof Winnerstrand as 	Appelgren
 Hilda Borgström as 	Mrs. Quist
 Axel Högel as Johansson
 Ilse-Nore Tromm as 	Mrs. Hjorth
 Albert Ståhl as 	Pettersson
 Åke Claesson as 	Doctor
 Olav Riégo as 	District Court Judge
 Erik Forslund as Fröjd 
 Inga-Lill Åhström as Nurse 
 Hartwig Fock as 	Customs Clerk 
 John Harryson as Office Clerk
 Erland Colliander as 	Office Clerk 
 Hugo Jacobsson as Porter 
 Yngve Nyqvist as Mrs. Hjorth's Guest
 Rune Stylander as 	Chief Physician 
 Bellan Roos as 	Waitress
 Wilma Malmlöf as 	Dishwasher

References

Bibliography 
 Krawc, Alfred. International Directory of Cinematographers, Set- and Costume Designers in Film: Denmark, Finland, Norway, Sweden (from the beginnings to 1984). Saur, 1986.

External links 
 

1946 films
Swedish drama films
1946 drama films
1940s Swedish-language films
Films directed by Edvin Adolphson
Films based on Danish novels
1940s Swedish films